Flavia Domitilla the Younger or Flavia Domitilla Minor (c. 45 – c. 66) was the only daughter of the Roman Emperor Vespasian.

Biography
She was the child of Vespasian and his wife Domitilla the Elder. She was born after her brother Titus and before her brother Domitian. At the age of fifteen, she was married to Quintus Petillius Cerialis, with whom she had a daughter, the later Christian saint Flavia Domitilla.

Domitilla died before Vespasian became emperor in 69. She was later deified by her younger brother Domitian, who also bestowed the honorific title of Augusta upon her.

Flavian family tree

See also
 List of Roman women

References

External links 

45 births
60s deaths
Flavian dynasty
Flavii Sabini
1st-century Roman women
Deified Roman women
Augustae
Daughters of Roman emperors